Oxyrrhynchium is a genus of mosses belonging to the family Brachytheciaceae. The genus has a cosmopolitan distribution.

Species
The following species are recognised in the genus Oxyrrhynchium:
 

Oxyrrhynchium altisetum 
Oxyrrhynchium arachnoideum 
Oxyrrhynchium bergmaniae 
Oxyrrhynchium clinocarpum 
Oxyrrhynchium compressifolium 
Oxyrrhynchium confervoideum 
Oxyrrhynchium corralense 
Oxyrrhynchium distantifolium 
Oxyrrhynchium hians 
Oxyrrhynchium kiusiuensis 
Oxyrrhynchium laosianum 
Oxyrrhynchium latifolium 
Oxyrrhynchium macroneuron 
Oxyrrhynchium orotavense 
Oxyrrhynchium ovatum 
Oxyrrhynchium peyronelii 
Oxyrrhynchium polystictum 
Oxyrrhynchium porothamnioides 
Oxyrrhynchium pringlei 
Oxyrrhynchium protractum 
Oxyrrhynchium pumilum 
Oxyrrhynchium remotifolium 
Oxyrrhynchium rigescens 
Oxyrrhynchium rugisetum 
Oxyrrhynchium rugosipes 
Oxyrrhynchium scabripes 
Oxyrrhynchium schleicheri 
Oxyrrhynchium selaginellifolium 
Oxyrrhynchium speciosum 
Oxyrrhynchium subasperum 
Oxyrrhynchium tenuinerve

References

Hypnales
Moss genera